In the early 1900s,  narrow-gauge railway lines started playing a significant role in South Africa. They facilitated the transport of various agricultural and mineral produce from locations hardly accessible by road. They therefore enabled many communities to become prosperous.

These lines featured the largest and most powerful locomotives ever in existence on two-foot-gauge railways worldwide.

All two-foot railways were operated isolated from each other. However, this did not prevent standardization and interchangeability of rolling stock and locomotives.

The larger railway lines operated their own workshops performing minor to major maintenance and/or repairs. For the purpose of major overhauls and interchangeability, rolling stock could be transported piggyback on Cape gauge rolling stock by means of a special access ramp on the break of gauge at Cape gauge junctions available on most of the two-foot lines.

Their decline started in the 1980s, the last commercial line ceased operations in the 1990s.  Only a few tourist, agricultural and/or heritage railways survive. Many defunct locomotives are plinthed at various former railway station sites or work on the Welsh Highland Railway and other heritage railways in and outside South Africa.

Nomenclature 

It is common for South Africans to consider anything less than 1,067 mm (3 ft 6 in, Cape gauge) as a narrow-gauge railway. They are accustomed referring to "Cape gauge" as "standard gauge".

Overview

 Western Cape + Northern Cape + Eastern Cape provinces: 580 km government, 60 km private lines.
 Kwazulu-Natal: 393 km government plus approx. 500 km sugar lines.
 Gauteng + Mpumalanga: 100 km, all gone.
 Free_State: 26 km private.

Railway lines with rails (partially) intact, operationally closed

Avontuur Railway

Port Elizabeth–Avontuur / Patensie

Extension to Patensie completed in 1914.

The Apple Express, a tourist train, ceased operations in December 2010.

Locomotives used
CGR Type A 2-6-4T
CGR Type C 0-4-0T
CGR NG 0-6-0T
CGR NG 4-6-2T
NG3
NG6
NG8
NG9
NG10
NG G11
NG G12
NG G13
NG G14
NG15
NG G16
91-000

Port Shepstone–Harding

It was closed by South African Railways in 1986 and then leased to the Alfred County Railway, which went bankrupt in 2004. The Banana Express continued under Patons Country Narrow Gauge Railway operations, having a temporary permit from Transnet and ceased operations in 2005. On 18 June 2008, a storm ruined the railway in the coastal area. A limited diesel locomotive hauled service has also operated between Paddock and Plains stations more recently.

Locomotives used
NG4
NG G12
NG G13
NG G14
NG G16
NG G16A
91-000

Closed or converted railway lines
The following railways were closed or converted to Cape gauge.

Bezuidenhout Light Railway

Locomotives used
NG1

Kearsney–Stanger Light Railway
The track was laid with 30 lb rails and had a ruling gradient of 1 in 30. The line carried sugar and tea, passenger trains were operated until about 1930.

Otavi Mining and Railway Company

1903–1961,  in German South-West Africa (today's Namibia). Built at the gauge of 600 mm, which did not prevent exchanging locomotives with the two foot (610 mm) lines in South Africa when it was taken over by South Africa (as part of the British Empire) in 1915. Regauged to cape gauge.

Before the gauge conversion many locomotives were interchanged with the South African two foot railway systems depending on various operational considerations. After the gauge conversion the remaining stock was transferred to the two-foot lines.

The gauge difference is explained by the metric system used by the Germans who built the Otavi Line, contrary to the South Africans who used imperial units.

Kalbaskraal–Hopefield–Saldanha
Operated from 1903–1926 and then re-gauged to Cape gauge. Originally built from Kalbaskraal to Hopefield, in 1913 the line was extended to Saldanha passing Vredenburg.

Locomotives used
NG6
NG7
NG8
NG9

Stations
Kalbaskraal–Darling–Hopefield–Vredenburg (branch)–Saldanha (Hoetjies Bay).

Pienaarsrivier–Pankop

Operated from 1906 to 1923, later extended. It was built by a farmer who bought the locomotives and rolling stock from army surplus stock of the Bezuidenhout Light Railway. The line was used to haul firewood. Converted to cape gauge.

Locomotives used
NG1
NG6

Stations
Pienaarsrivier – Bourke – Pankop

South Western Railway

Also known as Knysna Forest Railway. Open from 1907 to 1949, 22 miles, now closed. Operated between Knysna and Diepwalle in the Southern Cape by The South Western Railway Co. Ltd.

Stations
Knysna – Bracken Hill – Parkes – Diepwalle

Estcourt–Weenen
Between 1907 and 1983, a narrow gauge railway connected Weenen with Estcourt,  to the west, and provided an outlet for its agricultural produce and was thus called the "Cabbage Express". This line was the Natal Government Railway's first venture into narrow gauge operation. Its rails were lifted. The NG G11 number 55 remained plinthed at Weenen and was later refurbished and is now used on the Paton's County Railway.

Locomotives used
NGR Class N 4-6-2T 1906
NG3
NG G11
NG G13

Stations
Estcourt–Scheepersfontein–Peniston–Haviland–Wondergeluk–Stanley–Mielietuin–Mona–New Furrow–Weenen.

Umzinto–Donnybrook
The Umzinto–Donnybrook narrow-gauge railway was in existence from 1908 to 1987 and was 93 miles long. It is now closed and its tracks were lifted however the Ixopo to Madonela branch has been rebuilt from Allwoodburn to Madonela and is use by Patons Country Railway

Locomotives used
NG3
NG G11
NG G16

Stations
Umzinto–Esperanza–Nkwifa–Inverugie–Braemar–Glenrosa–Sawoti–Mbulula–Dumisa–Kenterton–Njane–Jolivet–Hlutankungu–Knockagh–Kunatha–Highflats–Rydal–Glen Beulah–Etterby–La Trappe–Ixopo with Branch to Madonela–Vause–Loch Buidhe–Crystal Manor–Lufafa Road–Mabedlana–Maxwell–Eastwolds–Carthill–Donnybrook

Stations Madonela Branch
Ixopo–Allwoodburn–Stainton–Carisbrooke–Ncalu–Madonela (Umzinkulu)

Umlaas Road–Mid Illovo
Umlaas Road to Mid Illovo, 27 miles opened in 1911 and closed 1985, with its rails lifted. Ruling gradient 1-in-30 compensated for 45.7 m (150 ft) minimum radius curves.

Locomotives used
NG6
NG G13

Stations
Umlaas Road–Killamy Road–Edinglassie–Tala–Eston–Ripley–Ntimbankulu–Milford–Mid Illovo.

Elandshoek–Mount Carmel
1925–1931, 12 miles, closed.
Locomotives used
NG1

Stations
Elandshoek–Two Falls–Solarvale East–Solarvale–Indiemiddel–Mount Carmel

Upington–Kakamas
1926–1949, 55 miles, re-gauged to Cape gauge.

Locomotives used
NG9
NG G12
NG G14

Stations
Upington–Keimoes–Kakamas

Fort Beaufort–Balfour–Seymour
1926–1940, 35 miles. First, a 25-mile stretch of narrow-gauge line was authorised at a cost of R130,000 between Fort Beaufort and Seymour. This line was later extended from Balfour 12 miles to Seymour. The line was re-gauged to Cape gauge between 1939 and 1940.

Locomotives used
NG6
NG G12
NG G14

Stations
Fort Beaufort–Balfour–Seymour

Heritage Railways

Sandstone heritage trust
At Sandstone Estates a 26 km line runs from Grootdraai in the south, northwards to the main farm, loco depot and marshalling and storage sidings at Hoekfontein and onwards via Mooihoek to a large loop at Vailima sidings/Ficksburg and the village at Vailima. There is also a short line, known as Seb's Railway, branching to the west at Hoekfontein and running to a balloon loop around a farm dam and suitable only for small locomotives.

The Sandstone Steam Railway first opened in 1998.

Its collection consists of narrow gauge stock collected from other closed 2 ft narrow gauge lines in Kwazulu Natal, elsewhere in South Africa, and from neighboring countries..

Patons Country Narrow Gauge Railway
The Patons Country Narrow Gauge Railway runs from Allwoodburn station Ixopo to Umzinkulu (Madonela). It was opened in 2000 on a branch of the former Umzinto – Donnybrook narrow gauge railway line.

Locomotives used
NG G11, two Avonside sugar cane loco's and Two 4 Cylinder Diesel Hunslet shunter,.

Agricultural Railways

Zebediela Sugar Estates
At Zebediela. Closed 1959.

Locomotives used
NG2, 
NG6

Sezela, Sugar railway system
At Sezela. A 125-mile cane sugar rail network. Built in 1914 and closed in the 1970s.

Umtwalumi Valley Estate
A sugar plantation in Natal.

Locomotives used
Hunslet 0-4-2 tank locomotive.

Renishaw Estates
Locomotives used
Hunslet 0-4-2 tank locomotive.

Chaka's Kraal Estate
A sugar plantation.

Tongaat Sugar Estates, Natal.
Locomotives used
Bagnall 4-4-0T

Darnall and Felixton sugar estates
Locomotives used
Various Bagnall.

Industrial

Belville quarry
SAR's Bellville quarry in the Tygerberg hill, employing Zwillinge locomotives.

Eastern Province Cement Company (EPCC)
Ran a private Branch from Chelsea junction at the Avontuur Railway to its cement factory at New Brighton in Port Elizabeth. This locomotive, numbered 2, had a 43-inch (1.1 m) diameter boiler producing  steam to 13.5-inch (34.4 cm) diameter cylinders through an 18-inch (46 cm) stroke powering 36-inch (92 cm) diameter drivers.
In 1973, it was wrecked after a runaway accident, and after years of idleness it was shipped to the Brecon Mountain Railway in Wales. The rebuild started in 1990 and the locomotive went back to service in 1997.

The EPCC also operated a South African Class NG8 4-6-0 and two 300 HP funkey diesel-mechanical B-B locomotives which were also shipped to Wales to be used on the Welsh Highland Railway (unaltered) and the Ffestiniog Railway, the latter implying the construction of a new body to be able to negotiate the strict loading gauge of that railway.
A third diesel, a three axle hunslet, survived in South Africa

Rustenburg Platinum Mines
????–1981. Approximately 10 miles. Platinum ore railway. Converted to Cape gauge.

Vogelspruit Gold Mining Areas Ltd 
Converted to Cape gauge.

West Rand Consolidated Mines
In Krugersdorp, using a CGR Type C 0-4-0T.

See also

 Rail transport in South Africa
 List of South African locomotive classes
 List of abandoned railway lines in South Africa
 Sandstone Estates

References

Notes

Bibliography

External links

General map of narrow gauge railways in South Africa, initial source for this article. From the Two Foot Preservation Trust website.
South African two foot gauge railways – RMWeb
South African narrow gauge rolling stock – RMWeb
Vanishing Steam; Article by the South African Tourist Corporation
Forum with Photographs of SA NG lines, Page 1 Page2

 
South Africa transport-related lists